Marie Colban (18 December 1814 – 27 March 1884) was a Norwegian novelist, short story writer and translator.

Biography
She was born at Christiania (now Oslo), Norway. She was the daughter of Peter Nicolai Schmidt (1776–1846) and Petronelle Sandberg (1787–1846). Her father was an attorney.
She was married to teacher Nathanael Angell Colban (1793–1850) from 1836. After his death in 1850 she resided in Paris from 1856 and also wrote for Norwegian newspapers. In the summer months she usually visited Norway, but in the autumn she returned to Paris.

She translated Eugène Sue's novel Mathilde and other literary works from French into Norwegian language.  Her first literary work was Lærerinden from 1869. She later wrote Tre Noveller, 1873,  and Jeg lever, 1877. 
From 1882 to 1884 she published a series of memoir articles from her Paris years in the magazine Nyt Tidsskrift. She spent her final years in Rome, where she died in 1884 and was buried at the Protestant Cemetery.

Selected works
Lærerinden, en Skizze, 1869
    Tre Noveller, tilegnet norske Kvinder, 1873
    Tre nye Noveller, 1875
    Jeg lever, 1877
    En gammel Jomfru, 1879
    Cleopatra, 1880
    Thyra, 1882

References

Further reading

1814 births
1884 deaths
Writers from Oslo
Norwegian translators
Norwegian women short story writers
Norwegian women novelists
19th-century translators
19th-century Norwegian novelists
19th-century Norwegian women writers
19th-century Norwegian writers
19th-century Norwegian short story writers
Translators to Norwegian
Translators from French